Tony Derrick Martin (born September 5, 1965), is an American former professional football player who was a wide receiver in the National Football League (NFL). He was selected by the New York Jets in the 5th round of the 1989 NFL Draft. He earned second-team All-Pro honors with the San Diego Chargers in 1996.

Career
Tony Martin was a 6'1" wide receiver out of Mesa State College in Grand Junction, Colorado. The New York Jets grabbed him with their fifth round pick of the 1989 NFL Draft. Martin, however, did not make the opening day roster in New York, and was placed on waivers. The Dolphins picked him up as a free agent prior to the 1990 NFL season.

Martin appeared in all 16 games that season for the Dolphins, starting five. He caught 29 passes for 388 yards and two touchdowns. He also returned 26 punts for Miami, for 140 yards.

He again played every game for Miami in 1991, catching 27 total passes for 434 yards and two touchdowns. On two occasions that season Martin would eclipse the 100-yard barrier.

1992 would again see Martin appear in every game for the Dolphins, starting three and catching 33 passes for 553 yards and two touchdowns.

Martin was limited by injuries to 12 games in 1993. He only caught 20 passes for 347 yards and three touchdowns. He did manage to log his third career 100-yard game, with a then career high 110 yards against the Washington Redskins in week four. The Dolphins won the game, 17–10.

The San Diego Chargers acquired Martin during the 1994 offseason, and in four years with the club, Martin caught 288 passes for 4,184 yards and 33 touchdowns. In 1996, he led the NFL with 14 touchdowns and received his only Pro Bowl invitation.

After joining the Atlanta Falcons for the 1998 season, Martin gained 1,181 yards on 66 passes, six of them for touchdowns. The Dolphins reacquired him prior to the 1999 season.

Martin had his best Miami season in 1999, catching 67 passes for 1,037 yards and five touchdowns. 2000 would see the 35-year-old receiver's skills start to decline, and his stats reflected it, as he caught only 26 passes for 393 yards that year.

Martin rejoined the Falcons for the 2001 season, gaining 548 yards on 37 passes.

Martin started 26 games for the Dolphins over six seasons and appeared in 86 overall for the team. He totalled 202 catches for 3,152 yards and 14 touchdowns.

NFL career statistics
Receiving 

Returning Stats

Rushing Stats

Personal life
He is divorced from actress LisaRaye McCoy.

References

1965 births
Living people
Miami Northwestern Senior High School alumni
Players of American football from Miami
American football wide receivers
Colorado Mesa Mavericks football players
Miami Dolphins players
San Diego Chargers players
Atlanta Falcons players
American Conference Pro Bowl players
New York Jets players